Okojie is a Nigerian surname. Notable people with the surname include:

 Benita Okojie (born 1988), Nigerian gospel singer
 Christopher Okojie (1920–2006), Nigerian doctor and politician
 Ogbidi Okojie (1857–1944), Nigerian royalty
 Victoria Okojie, Nigerian librarian, academician, and administrator

Surnames of Nigerian origin